Todke waterfall (Nepali: टोड्के झरना) is located in the hills of Maimajhuwa near Mai Pokhari in Ilam district. The fall feeds the Mai River. It has a height of 85 m.

The fall is accessible by trekking from the district headquarter. The local government is initiating to increase tourism in the area by developing roads and lodging facilities near the waterfall.

Gallery

See also
List of waterfalls of Nepal

References

Waterfalls of Nepal
Ilam District